The Negative Zone is a fictional setting, an antimatter universe appearing in American comic books published by Marvel Comics. The location is depicted in various publications from Marvel, most frequently in Fantastic Four and Captain Marvel. Created by Stan Lee and Jack Kirby, it first appeared in Fantastic Four #51 (June 1966).

Fictional description
The Negative Zone in the Marvel Universe is used as a fictional universe parallel to Earth's. While the universes are similar in many respects they are different in that: all matter in the Negative Zone is negatively charged; the Negative Zone is entirely filled with a pressurized, breathable atmosphere; and near the center of the Negative Zone is a deadly vortex of unspeakable power. Since the Negative Zone is largely uninhabited, several would-be conquerors have attempted to bridge the gap to Earth and take over its population. A few notable residents of the Negative Zone include Blastaar and Annihilus.

The Negative Zone is often visited by the Fantastic Four as Mister Fantastic discovered it, and has mapped portions of it extensively. The Age of Apocalypse version of Blink also visited it once, which proved that there's only one Negative Zone, as Annihilus remembered the Fantastic Four even though they never existed in the Age of Apocalypse.

For a number of years, Captain Mar-Vell and Rick Jones were bonded to each other, causing one of them to exist in the Negative Zone while the other would exist in the regular universe. They exchanged places by clasping the special bracelets each wore or automatically after a few hours.

Spider-Man has also visited the Negative Zone, and acquired a costume that allowed him to merge with shadows and become practically invisible. When he was framed by Norman Osborn a few weeks later, he used the costume to become the dark, mysterious Dusk (one of his four new superhero identities during the Identity Crisis story arc). A few months later after Spider-Man's name was cleared, Cassie St. Commons was given the guise of Dusk and joined the Slingers. Cletus Kasady also visited the Negative Zone, finding and bonding with a symbiote there, as he had lost the original Carnage symbiote when Venom absorbed it into his own symbiote.

History
The earliest origins of the Negative Zone and its culture have not been revealed, but rough estimates place its height of science and art over 1.5 million years ago, nearly coinciding with the rise of the Skrull and Kree races. It is believed that around that time the Negative Zone ceased expanding and began its "Big Crunch", contracting toward a central nexus. Some of the most powerful and influential races thereby faced destruction and sought to preserve their lives.

One of the more aggressive races at this time were the Tyannans. The lion-like bipeds explored much of the Negative Zone and eventually began to seed many of the planets, including Baluur, with their "spores of life". However, their final mission went awry.

A debris field had begun forming around Tyanna, which was at the very heart of the Negative Zone. The Big Crunch had begun pulling the universe back towards its center and planets crumbled under the increased pressure. One of the last remaining Tyannan ships careened off a large chunk of rock and crashed on the desolate planet of Arthros. The ship's engines dead and food processors destroyed, the Tyannan captain ordered the release of their life spores. Life slowly began to evolve on the planet, much as it did on Earth.

Farther from the core of the Negative Zone, other cultures thrived. One culture had gone so far as to cover half of their planet with a giant city, and then developed an artificial brain for it. The city, Ootah, even began to develop a sense of self-preservation and drove the inhabitants out of its boundaries, building up greater defenses to prevent them from returning.

Farther still from the core, the world of Kestor also flourished. It was the first recorded world beyond Tyanna that faced obliteration at the hands of the Big Crunch, roughly 10,000 years ago. Unlike Tyanna, whose gravitational force became greater than could sustain life, Kestor's sun was pulled toward the nexus. This caused the planet's several moons to shift their respective orbits and wreak havoc on the planet itself. As 20,000 beings left Kestor in a great space ark, the sun exploded with the fury of a supernova, substantially damaging their ship. All but 500 of the crew died and the navigational systems were destroyed, eliminating all hope of finding a new planet to call home.

One of the planets the Tyannans spored, Baluur, developed in a more barbarous manner. The inhabitants grew very large and powerful, and even the meek among them were stronger than an ordinary human. While they did progress technologically, their advances were at least partially driven by war. But they apparently began to experience the effects of the Big Crunch and several millennia ago they took their cities underneath the planet's surface. A sole entrance exists and is known only to the Baluurians themselves. They established a quiet monarchy and became very reclusive, only venturing into space on rare occasions.

Sentient life eventually developed on Arthros. A lone insect-like creature emerged from the primordial marsh one thousand years ago, and began to reason. A frail creature, he used his superior intellect to avoid larger predators and soon stumbled upon the Tyannan's derelict ship. Inside the craft, he donned a helmet in an attempt to warm himself. The helmet in fact had recordings of all the Tyannan technology and culture, and the creature was deftly able to assimilate all of it. He took the power from discarded life canisters and created a Cosmic Control Rod, capable of granting the wielder great power. Taking the name Annihilus, he set out to not only right those who wronged him, but to ensure that no one should ever harm him again.

While Annihilus forcibly took control of his immediate sector of space, a king rose to prominence on Baluur. Blastaar was a ruthless and powerful leader who sought to expand Baluurian domain. The other Baluurians feared him and were eventually able to depose him by sedating him heavily and sending him to what they hoped would be his destruction in the center of the Negative Zone.

Discovery
While searching for a way to travel through sub-space, Reed Richards stumbled upon a gateway to the Negative Zone. He spent a fair amount of time studying it through probes, and determined that it was largely unpopulated. So much so, in fact, that he—and others—used the Negative Zone on several occasions to get rid of difficult enemies, such as the Mad Thinker's android, the Super-Adaptoid, and even Galactus. Reed and the Fantastic Four have since done more detailed explorations of the Zone and no longer use it to dispose of villains.

For some time, the Norse realm of Asgard was lost in the Negative Zone.

Civil War

In the Super-Hero Civil War, a group of heroes led by Iron Man, Mister Fantastic and Yellowjacket have created a massive prison in the Negative Zone (similar to the Vault) to house captured non-registering heroes as they wait for their trials. It is designated Negative Zone Prison Alpha but nicknamed Fantasy Island by inmates. Tony Stark himself named it "Project 42", as it had been the 42nd idea out of a hundred that he, Reed Richards and Hank Pym had created following the Stamford Disaster. There are portals to it planned for every single state so prisoners can be transported there by the different teams in the Fifty State Initiative- including one at Ryker's Island. It is very clean, with sanitation, but extremely heavily guarded, including password-changes every ten minutes. Its most notable former inmates were Iron Fist (posing as Daredevil at the time), Cloak and Dagger, Speedball, Prodigy and Prowler.

It is also the setting for the final battle of the super hero civil war, as Iron Man lays a trap for Captain America but the Captain retaliates by using his planted mole, Hulkling, to release all the prisoners of 42 who come to his aid. Though in the ensuing battle Cloak manages to teleport all its superhuman detainees out, it remains as a prison for villains such as Lady Deathstrike and Taskmaster. (Taskmaster was later released to become the trainer for new Initiative recruits and Deathstrike seemingly escapes to assist in the Purifiers crusade during the Messiah Complex.) It also holds many of the Sakaaran forces from World War Hulk.

In the one-shot Civil War: The Return, the Prison's warden was revealed as the first Captain Marvel, apparently back from the dead. Although he was later revealed as a Skrull sleeper agent named Khn'nr, whose conditioning was so strong he kept believing he was the Captain even after he had realized he really was not.

Secret Invasion
In the Secret Invasion: Fantastic Four limited series, the Skrull warrior Lyja (posing as Susan Richards) sends the Baxter Building into the Negative Zone. She reveals herself to Johnny Storm (her former spouse) and attacks him, feeling angry that he had forgotten her. During the course of their battle, Johnny saves Lyja from being hit by a police car, pulled in through the portal. The two reconcile after that, but a Negative Zone creature attacks them. They manage to defeat the creature, but Lyja passes out from her injuries. A bit later, when the "new" Fantastic Four fly off to the prison, Franklin and Valeria are grabbed by Negative Zone creatures, but Lyja saves them. Later when Ben, Johnny, Franklin, Val and the Tinkerer are ready to leave the Negative Zone she refuses to leave, because she wants to find out who she is.

War of Kings
After the events of Secret Invasion, the inmates of the prison took control of the facility after their correction officers abandoned the prison. Blastaar later overrun the prison during the prelude to the War of Kings story arc.

Cataclysm
The Negative Zone is used to dispose of Earth-616's Galactus when he is accidentally transferred to the Ultimate Marvel universe due to the temporal distortions caused by the events of Age of Ultron. The heroes of the Ultimate Marvel universe reasoned that Galactus will starve to death in the Negative Zone because it is a universe made of antimatter and Galactus would not have anything to eat there.

Annihilation: Scourge
The Negative Zone is later visited by the Sentry, who is struggling to understand his new state of self and find a way to separate himself from the Void. Upon soaking up the negative cosmic rays, the Sentry is able to separate himself from the Void but is left in the powerless form of Bob Reynolds. The Void was then drawn to the Cancerverse realm, where nothing could die, and impersonating and taking on the appearance of the Sentry, the Void became the new leader of its forces. He then led them back to the Negative Zone, forcing longtime enemies Blastaar and Annihilus to team up against them to prevent the Negative Zone kingdoms from being ravaged by the Undying Ones. Led by the Revengers, an ever-growing army of zombie-esque drones slaughter and infect their way from world to world giving no quarter as they leave destruction in their wake. As their desperate attempt to defend their domain fails, both rulers discover in the process that the Void is planning to conquer the Negative Zone and its denizens before returning to his own universe to spread the Cancerverse's infection even further. Annihilus then crosses into the positive matter universe to seek assistance, only to land right in the lap of Richard Ryder the last Nova, however, the past trauma at the hands of the Cancerverse, caused Ryder to flee, leaving Annihilus at the mercy of his enemies. The Void then attempt to cross over into the positive Universe, but was stopped by Beta Ray Bill and Lockjaw, with Beta Ray Bill forced to sacrifice his magical hammer, Stormbreaker, in the process.

Unique features

The Crossroads of Infinity
Initially, it was generally believed that getting caught in the gravitational pull of the vortex at the center of the Zone meant certain death. However, some theorized that if one could survive entry into the vortex, one could travel to another dimension. However, this was only a theory until Doctor Doom gambled the lives of the Fantastic Four to prove it. Once inside the so-called Crossroads, individuals flip through a series of other parallel dimensions while progressing through. Coming to a halt seems to stabilize the Crossroads and then allows movement in the universe arrived in.

However, it still remains a risky trip for a number of reasons. First and foremost is the expenditure of energy necessary to keep from imploding. On one occasion, it required the use of both Annihilus' Cosmic Control Rod and the Invisible Woman's force field to stave off death. Second, and almost equally important, is the lack of control one has while passing through different dimensions. Even with the precise calculations of Dr. Doom, it required several hops to reach the dimension he sought.

Staying on a straight course to the very heart of the Crossroads leads one to Tyanna. Although it was believed to have been destroyed centuries earlier, the Tyannans' technology proved capable of sustaining them within the center of the vortex. Using their advanced machines, they were able to modify their bodies to exist safely in the immense pressures, but at the cost of being forced to remain hidden within the Crossroads. The Tyannans remain there, content to pursue their scientific interests.

The Distortion Area
Normally beings enter the Negative Zone through the Distortion Area. This is an invisible sphere of energy that resides in the Negative Zone but is accessible from many parts of Earth. By hitting the field with a precise wavelength of energy, a rift opens between both dimensions connected by the Distortion Area. This area acts as a buffer between the two polar opposite universes and alters a traveler's own polarity so that they may exist in the other dimension without harm.

When activated, the Distortion Area appears from the outside as a crackling energy source roughly six feet in circumference. This effect only lasts as long as the field is activated and, once closed, becomes invisible again. Nearby matter is sucked into the near-vacuum of the Distortion Area and "falls" for about 50 seconds before emerging on the other side.

The Distortion Area itself is nothing short of indescribable. Humans cannot begin to accurately fathom or record what transpires within the Distortion Area and travelers' minds try to compensate with a bizarre display of light and color. Combined with the natural turbulence in the area, many find the trip rather nauseating.

Like any other mode of transport, choosing where to enter the Distortion Area in part affects where an individual is deposited on the other side. Reed Richards' former lab in the Baxter Building, for example, deposited someone at the outskirts of the Debris Field near Arthros. A rift opened on Yancy Street, however, dropped a traveler on the planet Tarsuu.

Other methods may be employed to reach the Negative Zone but, while they tend to be more spatially accurate, they are very difficult to come by. Generally, this mode of transport is reserved by extremely powerful entities like Thor, the Supreme Intelligence, Galactus and the Watchers. Captain Mar-Vell's Nega-Bands could also transport the wearer to the Negative Zone but the precise destination was dependent upon the location of the Nega-Band's counterparts worn by Rick Jones.

Emotions
One of the rather undocumented side-effects the Negative Zone has on people seems to involve bringing forth what are usually considered negative emotions. At this point, it is difficult to determine the cause of this unusual phenomenon, but a number of dealings with the Negative Zone have given the impression that something inherent within it can lead to emotional distress.

The severity of this distress can vary greatly. On a few occasions, it has manifested itself as a citywide panic. Other times, it merely caused a single person to temporarily lose their hope. Still other times, it caused several individuals to experience emotionally charged flashbacks, pulled from their subconscious. And, although it could be attributed to his psyche, Annihilus' main motivation is an obsessive fear of death.

Not all inhabitants of the Negative Zone experience anything beyond normal anxieties, but the number of known instances of unusual psychological distress seems rather high. Visitors to the Zone may or may not experience anything emotionally disturbing. While there is no concrete evidence to show the correlation the Negative Zone has with emotional discord, it remains a significant feature of the region.

Life
As mentioned previously, the Negative Zone was originally thought to be largely uninhabited. Though this is now known to be incorrect, life having arisen on a number of its planets, the Zone is still mostly unoccupied space. Most of the encounters heroes have had with the Negative Zone revolve around Annihilus and/or Blastaar.

Curiously, for as little life as there exists in the Negative Zone, it is very capable of supporting life. There, outer space itself is permeated with an oxygen-rich atmosphere, closely approximating Earth's. Consequently, humans can exist peacefully in space without the need for cumbersome pressure suits or oxygen masks.

It is perhaps an issue of gravitational pull that is one of the biggest hindrances to life in the Negative Zone. While all objects of reasonably sized mass (planets, moons, asteroids, etc.) obviously have their own gravitational pull, it is weak enough to be overcome with minimal effort. Most heroes with flight capabilities can escape a planet's gravitational field with ease, as can any machine with the capacity for flight. Because of this lowered gravity, it is believed that vegetation has difficulty seeding properly, giving life a tenuous foothold at best on any given planet.

Moisture also seems to be an issue in the dearth of life in the Negative Zone. While each planet has hardly been explored in full, many of the ones studied—including those that are inhabited—have shown few, if any, natural water sources. Most planets appear to be very arid, with cultures adapting to the lack of moisture much as was done on Earth's deserts.

Time
Being a different dimension with different laws of physics, time flows differently in the Negative Zone than it does on Earth. Although a comprehensive analysis has never been completed, preliminary findings suggest that two weeks pass in the Negative Zone for every hour on Earth, making a 336:1 ratio. On a smaller scale, every minute on Earth is a little over five and half hours in the Negative Zone.

It seems, however, that this ratio changes as one approaches the center of the Negative Zone. Since there have been several instances of pan-dimensional conversations between the two planes, it appears the time ratio is much closer to 1:1 when one is at the nexus of the Negative Zone. It is currently unclear at what rate the time difference increases as one moves away from the vortex or if there is an upper limit to how great the difference between the two universes can become.

Planets
The Negative Zone includes the following planets:

 Argor – A planet that is home to the Argorans.
 Arthros – A planet that is home to Annihilus and the Arthosians (a race of insectoids).
 Baluur – A planet that is home to Blastaar.
 Kestor – A planet that was destroyed causing the Kestorians to become nomads.
 Tarsuu – 
 Tyanna – A planet that is home to the Tyannans (a race of lion-like aliens). Tyanna is located at the Crossroads of Infinity. The Tyannan scientists genetically engineered a spore that could be scattered over an uninhabited planet's surface where they can grow into new plants and animals. This terraforming made the planet habitable.

Other versions
In the Blink miniseries, it is established that there is in fact only one Negative Zone in the multiverse of Marvel Universe, with exit points to different realities and timelines, as the Blink from the Age of Apocalypse found herself in a Negative Zone that still remembered the Fantastic Four's role in defeating Annihilus despite the fact that the team never existed in her world. This goes along with the Mutant X Universe, where Havok tried to get back from the Mutant X-verse to the main Marvel earth by a detour through the Negative Zone. Additionally both Rikki Barnes and Onslaught traveled from the Pocket Universe of Heroes Reborn to the mainstream Marvel Universe through the Negative Zone. During the Cataclysm event it is again established that there is in fact only one Negative Zone in the multiverse of Marvel Universe, with exit points to different realities and timelines, as the Ultimate Marvel heroes, after a brief trip to Earth-616 to acquire local information on Galactus, eventually manage to send Galactus to the Negative Zone, reasoning that he will eventually starve to death because Negative Zone is made of anti-matter, however, following an incident on Earth 616 where the Eternal known as Ikaris is brainwashed by a Kree device called the God's Whisper, the Eternals retrieve, with help from Aarkus, the comatose Galactus from the Negative Zone, and state that they plan to use the God's Whisper to unleash him upon the Kree when he awakens as revenge for what they did to Ikaris.

Ultimate Marvel (The N-Zone)
The Ultimate Marvel equivalent of the Negative Zone was originally called the N-Zone, a zone that exists directly below the Ultimate Marvel universe. It is tied to the powers granted to the Fantastic Four and is the homeplace of the Ultimate Fantastic Four villain Nihil. The N-Zone is a universe in the later stages of entropic heat death, with less than a million years of existence left to it. There are few stars still burning, mostly long-lived red dwarf stars, and despite the advanced technology of many races, life barely maintains a toehold on its existence. Space is also apparently foreshortened in this universe, with the Fantastic Four's shuttle Awesome achieving speeds that would be impossible in our own universe. It has an atmosphere that is lethally acidic to humans and the Ultimate Fantastic Four, with the exception of the Thing, required space suits to live.

Later it was reckoned that the N-Zone is one of many other zones, labeled with letters (e.g. the Z-Zone and the Q-Zone) implying that the N is merely a categorization, not a shortening of the word "negative" therefore no longer connected to the Negative Zone. A proper Negative Zone was eventually introduced in the Ultimate Marvel where The Ultimates confront Reed Richards.

Heroes Reborn (2021)
In an alternate reality depicted in the 2021 "Heroes Reborn" miniseries, the Negative Zone is used by the Squadron Supreme of America to imprison Earth's most dangerous villains, such as General Annihilus, Doctor Juggernaut, the Hulk, Mister Beyonder, Namor, and Hank Pym / Ultron.

In other media

Television
 The Negative Zone appears in the 1994 Fantastic Four episode, "Behold the Negative Zone".
 In a scripted, but unproduced episode of Silver Surfer titled "Down to Earth" Part 3, Reed Richards uses the Negative Zone as a means to contain Terrax.
 The Negative Zone appears in Fantastic Four: World's Greatest Heroes. This version is depicted as an alternate dimension inhabited by an array of various serpentine and insectoid creatures. According to Doctor Doom, the Negative Zone is a nexus for various other universes and claims that he discovered it years before Reed Richards.
 The Negative Zone appears in the Iron Man: Armored Adventures episode "The Makluan Invasion". It is depicted as a dark empty void which the Mandarin banished S.H.I.E.L.D.'s Helicarrier to before rescuing it at the end of the episode following the titular event.
 The Negative Zone appears in The Avengers: Earth's Mightiest Heroes. It debuts in the episode "The Man Who Stole Tomorrow", when Thor, Ant-Man, and the Wasp place Blizzard in Negative Zone Prison 42. In the episode "Assault on 42", Annihilus and his insectoid slaves attack Prison 42, but were defeated by the joint forces of Captain America, Thor, Wasp, Miss Marvel, and the imprisoned supervillains of Prison 42. In the episode "Avengers Assemble", Mister Fantastic and Iron Man create a portal to the Negative Zone to send Galactus there to feed on its infinite anti-matter instead of Earth, using Galactus's own emitted energy as a tractor beam.
 The Negative Zone appears in the Hulk and the Agents of S.M.A.S.H. episodes "Doorway to Destruction", "Into the Negative Zone", and "Days of Future Smash" Pt. 5.

Film
In the original script for the Fantastic Four reboot by Jeremy Slater, the Negative Zone was reinvented as a planet that was home to ancient alien civilization before being destroyed by Galactus. However, after re-shoots and edits, the Negative Zone was renamed Planet Zero, and reworked into a planet with a cracked landscape and unstable energy that becomes the source of the titular characters' and Victor von Doom's mutations.

Video games
 The Negative Zone appears in Marvel: Ultimate Alliance 2. It contains "Prison 42", a prison for unregistered heroes and nanite-controlled supervillains, and where the Fold first becomes active before Nick Fury destroyed it to keep the Fold from invading Earth.
 The Negative Zone appears in the Marvel Super Hero Squad: The Infinity Gauntlet video game.

See also
 Phantom Zone
 Qward

References

External links
 Negative Zone at Marvel.com
 Negative Zone at Marvel Wiki

Fictional elements introduced in 1966
Marvel Comics dimensions